Blå ("Blue") is a jazz club in Grünerløkka, Oslo, Norway.

Blå opened on February 28, 1998; the initiators were Kjell Einar Karlsen and Martin Revheim. It is located in factory building close to Akerselva, a river running through downtown. Darwin Porter of Frommer's describes the club as "the leading jazz club to Oslo. Dark and industrial, with lots of wrought iron and mellow lighting, this place books some of the best jazz acts in the world. The crowd is a mix of young and old, dressed in casual, but sophisticated attire." Despite this, the club has also featured other music genres, such as pop, rock, electronic and hip-hop.

References

External links

Jazz clubs in Oslo
Grünerløkka
Music venues completed in 1998
1998 establishments in Norway